Matthew David Morris (born Matthew Burton Morris on May 9, 1979) is an American singer, songwriter, and record producer. He has released solo projects on Tennman/Interscope Records, but is best known for his work as a songwriter and producer for a variety of artists, including Joy Williams, Justin Timberlake, Christina Aguilera, Kelly Clarkson, Reba McEntire, Mary J. Blige, Sarah McLachlan, Kimbra, and Cher.

He achieved early fame when he appeared on the Disney Channel television series The All-New Mickey Mouse Club, A.K.A. MMC in the early 1990s, where he was a cast member from 1991 to 1996 (seasons 4–7). Morris' January 2010 performance of Leonard Cohen's "Hallelujah" with Justin Timberlake and Charlie Sexton on the Hope for Haiti Now telethon became the most downloaded song from the international broadcast's digital release and went to No. 1 on the iTunes music chart and No. 13 on the Billboard Hot 100.

Early life

Matt Morris was born and reared in Denver, Colorado by his mother and stepfather, and had no intention of being a country singer like his father, Gary Morris, an American country music artist who charted a string of countrypolitan-styled hit songs throughout the 1980s. However, Morris learned much about songwriting from his father, Gary.

Morris's biological parents divorced while he was still an infant. Morris was raised in Denver by his mother Teri Hernandez, and his stepfather Ken. They lived in the Barnum neighborhood of Denver until Morris was in the fourth grade, when they moved to Bear Valley.

In 1991, when Morris was in sixth grade, he joined the cast of the Mickey Mouse Club. His cast mates included future collaborator and pop superstars Justin Timberlake and Christina Aguilera. The show ended in 1994, when Morris was 15. Morris returned to his home in Denver, Colorado with the intention of distancing himself from the entertainment industry and reconnecting with his friends and family. Morris attended John F. Kennedy High School and starred in a number of high school plays, including South Pacific and The King and I.

Morris grew up in an Episcopalian household.

Musical career

He is the son of country music star Gary Morris. He achieved early fame when he appeared on the Disney Channel television series The All-New Mickey Mouse Club, A.K.A. MMC in the early 1990s, where he was a cast member from 1991 to 1996 (seasons 4–7). Here he met future collaborators Justin Timberlake and Christina Aguilera, along with future celebrities Britney Spears, Ryan Gosling, Chasen Hampton, Keri Russell, and JC Chasez. Morris first experienced success as a songwriter in the early 2000s. Morris collaborated with Aguilera on her 2002 RCA Records, "Stripped", co-writing five songs with Aguilera and producer Scott Storch, including the hit "Can't Hold Us Down". Another of their collaborations, "Miss Independent", went on to become a number one hit for American Idol winner, Kelly Clarkson. Morris continued his success in songwriting by co-writing with Timberlake the song "Another Song (All Over Again)" for Timberlake's second solo album, FutureSex/LoveSounds (2006). The track was produced by Rick Rubin, and the album debuted at number one on the Billboard 200 chart. Morris co-wrote with Timberlake a song for Reba McEntire's Reba: Duets album, which McEntire sang with Timberlake. Morris co-wrote the song "Woman's World", the first single from Cher's album Closer to the Truth (2013).

 Morris' January 2010 performance of Leonard Cohen's "Hallelujah" with Justin Timberlake and Charlie Sexton on the Hope For Haiti Now telethon became the most downloaded song from the international broadcast's digital release and went to No. 1 on the iTunes music chart and No. 13 on the Billboard Hot 100 During the same month, Morris released When Everything Breaks Open on Timberlake's Tennman Records. The release gained wide distribution through Interscope Records, garnering much praise in the press. Morris was let go from his deal with Tennman and Interscope in 2011, and continues to write songs for other recording artists.

UnSpoken
In 2003, Morris released the independent album UnSpoken. To promote the album, Morris toured colleges around the United States and gave an interactive session and dialogue with audiences called "Reflections on Artistry and the Business of Music: A Dialogue with Matt Morris." The event consisted of a discussion of Morris' experiences in the music industry, as well as his thoughts about file sharing.

Backstage at Bonnaroo and Other Acoustic Performances EP
Morris performed at the 2008 Bonnaroo Music Festival. While at the festival, Morris and producer, Charlie Sexton, recorded a series of acoustic performances backstage in the Music Allies recording studio. The songs were compiled as the 5 song EP, Backstage at Bonnaroo and Other Acoustic Performances, and released by Tennman Records September 23, 2008.

When Everything Breaks Open
On January 12, 2010, Morris released When Everything Breaks Open on Justin Timberlake's label, Tennman Records. In support of the album, Morris performed on a number of television shows, including the Late Show with David Letterman, The Ellen DeGeneres Show, and Lopez Tonight. When Everything Breaks Open was co-produced by Charlie Sexton and Justin Timberlake. The album was recorded largely at Public Hi-Fi, a recording studio in Austin, Texas founded by Spoon's Jim Eno.

Hallelujah
On January 22, 2010, Morris performed the Leonard Cohen song, "Hallelujah", with Justin Timberlake and Charlie Sexton during the Hope For Haiti Now telethon. The recording of the song became the most downloaded track from the album, and it charted in the top 20 of the Billboard Hot 100 chart.

Live Forever video
The first video from When Everything Breaks Open was for the song, "Live Forever". The video was directed by Matt Stawski, with art by Serge Gay, Jr.. The video takes place in a non-descript suburban neighborhood and is rich with animation.

Shlomo
Morris was offered the lead role alongside India.Arie in a Broadway production produced by Daniel Wise entitled "Shlomo". The musical is based on the life of Shlomo Carlebach, also known as the Singing Rabbi.

Songwriter credits

2002
"Can't Hold Us Down", "Walk Away", "Infatuation", "Loving Me 4 Me", "Underappreciated" on Christina Aguilera's Stripped

2003
"Miss Independent" on Kelly Clarkson's Thankful

2006
"(Another Song) All Over Again" Justin Timberlake's FutureSex/LoveSounds

2007
"The Only Promise That Remains" on Reba McEntire's Reba: Duets

2011
"Need Someone" on Mary J. Blige's My Life II... The Journey Continues (Act 1)

2012
"Woman's World" on Cher's Closer to the Truth.

2014
Love in High Places – Kimbra
Song for My Father – Sarah Mclachlan
Love Beside Me – Sarah Mclachlan
90s Music – Kimbra
90s Music M Phazes Remix – Kimbra
Broken Over You – Grace Mitchell
Little Secret – Nikki Yanofsky

2015
Stand By You – Rachel Platten
Woman (Oh Mama) – Joy Williams
Love Beside Me –  Joy Williams
One Day I Will  –  Joy Williams
What A Good Woman Does  –  Joy Williams
Welcome Home  –  Joy Williams
Till Forever  –  Joy Williams
You Loved Me  –  Joy Williams
Sweet Love of Mine  –  Joy Williams
Dying Kind  –  Joy Williams
Call – Francesco Yates
Better To Be Loved – Francesco Yates
Me & My Girls – Selena Gomez

Performance credits

2010
performed "Hallelujah" live with Justin Timberlake and Charlie Sexton. "Hallelujah" was written by Canadian singer-songwriter Leonard Cohen and released on Cohen's seventh studio album, Various Positions (1984).
featured on "Infatuation" by Flobots. "Infatuation" is co-written by Morris and included on Flobots second studio album, Survival Story (2010).

Personal life
Morris is openly gay, and married Sean Michael Morris when same-sex couples were allowed to do so in California. His husband was his inspiration for the song "Love" found on his debut album. He has three mixed breed dogs named Max, Rupert, and Elliott. He has various tattoos and his favorite one is a sacred heart on his chest, drawn by the late artist Lee Ball. Morris lives in Portland, Oregon.

Morris blogged about his religious journey under the name Teo Bishop from 2009 to 2014, and in 2012 he changed his legal name to Teo Bishop. He changed his name back to Matthew in 2014.

Morris began writing the blog Faith and Formation in March 2015.

Discography 
2003: UnSpoken
2008: Backstage at Bonnaroo and other Acoustic Performances EP
2010: When Everything Breaks Open

References

External links

 

Teo on HuffPost Religion

1979 births
American male singer-songwriters
American male pop singers
Living people
Mouseketeers
American gay musicians
LGBT people from Colorado
21st-century American singers
American singer-songwriters